Nicholas Lawrence Bertus (born 24 July 1993) is an Australian cricketer who represents New South Wales. He made his first-class debut for New South Wales in the 2018–19 Sheffield Shield season on 20 March 2019. He made his List A debut in the 2019–20 Marsh One-Day Cup, against Queensland, on 22 September 2019, scoring 69 not out. He made his Twenty20 debut on 22 January 2022, for the Sydney Sixers in the 2021–22 Big Bash League season.

References

External links
 

1993 births
Living people
Australian cricketers
New South Wales cricketers
Sydney Sixers cricketers
Place of birth missing (living people)